On April 8, 2011, the Iraqi Army launched a raid against the People's Mujahedin of Iran (PMOI or MKO), an Iranian opposition group based at Camp Ashraf. 34 people were killed and 318 injured in the raid. The attack was denounced as a "massacre" by PMOI leader Maryam Rajavi and U.S. Senator John Kerry.

Background
Camp Ashraf is located northeast of the Iraqi town of Khalis, about 120 kilometers west of the Iranian border and 60 kilometers north of Baghdad, and is the seat of the PMOI. Iraq and Iran have designated the PMOI a terrorist group, though not the United States, European Union or United Nations. The PMOI was welcomed into Iraq in the 1980s by then-President Saddam Hussein who funded and armed the group, which fought alongside Iraqi forces during the Iran–Iraq War.

Following the 2003 U.S. invasion of Iraq, U.S. troops took control of Camp Ashraf and disarmed its fighters. In return, the U.S. military signed an agreement which provided the camp's 3,400 residents protected status under the Geneva Conventions.

In 2009, the U.S. military handed over control to the Shi'a dominated Iraqi government, which has repeatedly vowed to close the camp as Prime Minister Nouri al-Maliki has reportedly been trying to bolster his country's ties with Iran.

The Iraqi Army has raided Camp Ashraf prior to the April 2011 attack. In July 2009, Iraqi security forces entered the camp, killing at least nine people and injuring some 400 people.

Raid
Prior to the raid, tensions had been building between the Iraq army and Ashraf residents, who feared an impending attack as soldiers built up their forces outside the camp. The Iraqi general, Ali Ghaidan Majid, who led the raid stated it was in response to Ashraf residents tossing rocks at his troops and throwing themselves in front of military vehicles.

Following the raid, which left 34 dead, the PMOI released footage filmed and edited by members of the group, which show Iraqi soldiers firing at unarmed civilians at Camp Ashraf, and using military vehicles to herd and run down crowds of people. Iraqi authorities, on the other hand, claimed that only three people were killed resisting a military operation to return land from camp residents to farmers.

Reactions
  – Iraqi government spokesman Ali al-Dabbagh released a statement in which he said that "This organisation [the MKO] must be removed from Iraqi territory by all means, including political and diplomatic, with the co-operation of the UN and international organisations."
  – UN High Commissioner for Human Rights Navi Pillay condemned the Iraqi military operation and called for a long-term solution to Camp Ashraf's residents: "There is no possible excuse for this number of casualties. There must be a full, independent and transparent inquiry, and any person found responsible for use of excessive force should be prosecuted... "I am well aware that this is a contentious group [the PMOI], with a complicated history, but leaving them to fester in Camp Ashraf was never going to be a solution."
  – U.S. Senator John Kerry, Chairman of the Senate Foreign Relations Committee, condemned the raid as a "massacre" and stated the situation at Camp Ashraf was "untenable": "United Nations confirmation of the scope of last week’s tragedy at Camp Ashraf is deeply disturbing and the Iraqi military action is simply unacceptable. Corrective action is imperative. First, the Iraqis must stop the bleeding and refrain from any further military action against Camp Ashraf. Second, the Iraqi government has announced a full investigation into the massacre and it must be thorough and serious."

See also
 2013 Camp Ashraf attack

References

2011 in Iraq
April 2011 events in Iraq
Conflicts involving the People's Mojahedin Organization of Iran
Iran–Iraq relations
Mass murder in 2011
Massacres in Iraq
Military operations of the Iraq War in 2011